Jeremy Arnaud Petris (born 28 January 1998) is a French-Martiniquais professional footballer who plays as a defender for Bulgarian First League club Levski Sofia.

Club career

Gozzano
After two years with Paris FC II, Petris joined Italian side Gozzano in July 2017. He made his professional debut for the club on 27 August with a 3–0 cup win over Borgosesia. He scored his first league goal against Carrarese on 12 December 2018.

Crotone
Petris moved to Crotone in Serie B on 30 January 2019 and remained on loan with Gozzano until the end of the season.

Bisceglie (loan)
In January 2020, Petris went on loan to Bisceglie in Serie C. He debuted against Rende on 22 January.

Pro Vercelli (loan)
In September 2020, he again went on loan to Pro Vercelli in Serie C. He played his first match on 4 October in a league draw with Pro Patria.

Tsarsko Selo
In February 2022, Petris transferred permanently to Bulgarian First League club  Tsarsko Selo for free. He made his league debut on 20 February against Beroe.

Levski Sofia
Less than a year later, on 14 July, he moved to Levski Sofia on a free transfer. He made his league debut on 16 July against Spartak Varna. He made his European debut on 21 July against PAOK in a UEFA Conference League qualifying match.

International career
In March 2023, Petris received his first call-up for Martinique for the Nations League match against Costa Rica on 25 March.

Career statistics

Club

Notes

References

External links
 
 
 Jeremy Petris at Levski Sofia

1998 births
Living people
French footballers
French expatriate footballers
Association football midfielders
Championnat National 3 players
Serie D players
Serie C players
Paris FC players
A.C. Gozzano players
F.C. Crotone players
A.S. Bisceglie Calcio 1913 players
F.C. Pro Vercelli 1892 players
FC Tsarsko Selo Sofia players
French expatriate sportspeople in Italy
Expatriate footballers in Italy
PFC Levski Sofia players